Pseudopostega perdigna is a moth of the family Opostegidae. It was described by Walsingham, Lord Thomas de Grey, in 1914. It is known from Guerrero, Mexico.

The length of the forewings is about 6 mm. Adults have been recorded in July.

References

Opostegidae
Moths described in 1914